Henrique Montes was an early colonial explorer in Brazil, a veteran, like , of the Armada of Juan Díaz de Solís.

He had practical duties and was in charge of the supply ship.

Having interfered with the disruption of power of Bachelor Cosme Fernandes, his existence came to an end before the forces of Rui Mosquera.

References

Colonial Brazil
History of São Paulo